Plocamosaris is a genus of moth in the family Gelechiidae.

Species
Plocamosaris auritogata (Walsingham, 1911)
Plocamosaris pandora Meyrick, 1912
Plocamosaris telegraphella (Walker, 1866)

References

Dichomeridinae